Sándor Pethes (28 May 1899 – 29 June 1981) was a Hungarian actor.

Selected filmography
 Rongyosok (1925)
 Átok vára (1927)
 Csak egy kislány van a világon (1930)
 A kék bálvány (1931)
 Spring Shower (1932)
 The New Relative (1934)
 Romance of Ida (1934)
 The Dream Car (1934)
 Everything for the Woman (1934)
 St. Peter's Umbrella (1935)
 Villa for Sale (1935)
 Pókháló (1936)
 Family Bonus (1937)
 Magda Expelled (1938)
 The Hen-Pecked Husband (1938)
 Billeting (1938)
 Azurexpress (1938)
 Istvan Bors (1939)
 The Perfect Man (1939)
 Duel for Nothing (1940)
 The Relative of His Excellency (1941)
 Háry János (1941)
 Mask in Blue (1943)
 Orient Express (1943)
 Mickey Magnate (1949)
 Iron Flower (1958)

External links

1899 births
1981 deaths
Hungarian male film actors
Hungarian male silent film actors
20th-century Hungarian male actors
Actors from Košice